Stonega Historic District is a national historic district located at Appalachia, Wise County, Virginia. The district encompasses 80 contributing buildings in the coal company town of Stonega. It includes a variety of residential, commercial, institutional, and industrial buildings built after the towns' founding in 1895.  Notable buildings include the Catholic Church (c. 1906), Stonega Colored Methodist Church (c. 1906), Stonega Colored School / Community Building, Stonega Bath House (c. 1938), and Stonega Colored School.

Large homes were built for company doctors and less grand but almost as large was a house for the superintendent. Ten, Four and Seven car garages were also built for cars.

It was listed on the National Register of Historic Places in 2004.

Gallery

References

Historic districts in Wise County, Virginia
National Register of Historic Places in Wise County, Virginia
Historic districts on the National Register of Historic Places in Virginia